MV Songea is a ferry operated by the Marine Services Company Limited of Tanzania on Lake Nyasa.

References

1974 ships
Ferries of Tanzania